Hugh Calkins (February 20, 1924 – August 4, 2014) was an American lawyer and educator, who served as a member of the Harvard Corporation from 1968 to 1985.

Early life
Calkins was born in Newton, Massachusetts in 1924, and went to Phillips Exeter Academy before attending Harvard College. As an undergraduate, he served briefly as president of the Harvard Crimson in 1942. He graduated magna cum laude in mechanical engineering. He joined the United States Army Air Forces and was on the staff at the Guam Air Depot, which provided aircraft maintenance. He served until 1946 and became a captain.

Career
After the war, Calkins returned to Harvard to attend law school, was president of the Law Review, and graduated with enough honors in 1949 to win a job as a law clerk to Learned Hand, then the chief judge of the United States Court of Appeals for the Second Circuit. He spent the following year clerking for Justice Felix Frankfurter on the Supreme Court of the United States.

Lawyer
In 1951, Calkins moved to Cleveland, where he made a name for himself and worked for the law firm Jones Day. Calkins was active in regard to national legal issues, most notably serving as deputy director of President Eisenhower's Commission on National Goals. He was elected to the Harvard Corporation in 1968, on the basis of work he had done setting long-term goals for the government. His efforts landed him on the master list of Nixon political opponents.

Calkins stepped down from the Harvard Corporation in 1985, and was succeeded by Henry Rosovsky.

Educator
After retiring from his legal career, Calkins began a second career in public education. He earned a teaching certificate at John Carroll University, spent several years teaching in inner-city Cleveland schools, founded a charter school and ran an organization called Initiatives in Urban Education. He also founded Plan for Action by Citizens for Education (PACE) and served on the Cleveland Board of Education from 1965 to 1969.

Death
Calkins died on August 4, 2014, at the age of 90.

See also
List of law clerks of the Supreme Court of the United States (Seat 2)

References

1924 births
2014 deaths
Harvard Law School alumni
Harvard College alumni
The Harvard Crimson people
Law clerks of the Supreme Court of the United States
Law clerks of Judge Learned Hand
United States Army Air Forces officers
United States Army Air Forces personnel of World War II